Clodiense Società Sportiva Dilettantistica S.r.l. is an Italian association football club located in Chioggia, Veneto. It plays in Serie D.

History

From A.S.D. Clodiense to Clodiense S.S.D. 
The club was founded on 19 July 2011 as A.S.D. Clodiense after the merger of A.C. Chioggia Sottomarina and A.S.D. Sottomarina Lido. The club started to play in Eccellenza Veneto (the last league of A.S.D. Sottomarina Lido) and gained promotion to serie D after just one season.

In the summer 2012 it was renamed with the current name.

The origins

From Union Clodia Sottomarina F.B.C. to A.C. Chioggia Sottomarina 

 Union Clodia Sottomarina F.B.C.  was founded in 1971, when two teams from Chioggia, U.S. Sottomarina Lido (founded in 1959 and based in the frazione of Sottomarina) and Clodia, were merged.

After many years in Serie C, in 1977 the team was relegated to lower divisions.

In 1989 the club changed its name to S.S.C. Chioggia Sottomarina and in 1995 to A.C. Chioggia Sottomarina and three years later, it was promoted from Eccellenza Veneto to Serie D.

In the summer 2011 it does not join to the 2011-12 Serie D.

A.S.D. Sottomarina Lido 
Sottomarina Lido was refounded in 2006 with the traditional colors black and green, restarting from Promozione Veneto acquiring the sports title of Fossò by businessman Ivano Boscolo Bielo. Thanks to the former executive of A.C. Chioggia Sottomarina for ten years, the football returned thus in the fraction of Sottomarina after 35 years.

In its last season it played in 2010–11 Eccellenza Veneto.

Colors and badge 
Its colors are all-dark red, in reference to the Grande Torino, were two players born in Chioggia, brothers Aldo and Dino Ballarin, played.

References

External links 
Official website

Football clubs in Italy
Chioggia
Association football clubs established in 2011
Football clubs in Veneto
2011 establishments in Italy